Alpalhão is a civil parish in the municipality of Nisa, Portugal. The population in 2011 was 1,238, in an area of 34.16 km2.

References

Freguesias of Nisa, Portugal